Westgold Resources is an Australian-based, Australian Securities Exchange-listed (ASX) gold producer and explorer based in Perth, Western Australia.

Formed in 1987, the company briefly lost its independence and was delisted from the ASX after it merged with Metals X in 2012, but the two companies de-merged in 2016 and Westgold was re-listed.

2022, Westgold operates three mining centres in Western Australia, the Fortnum Gold Mine, the Meekatharra Gold Operation centred around the Bluebird Gold Mine, and the Cue Gold Operation, which includes the historic Big Bell Gold Mine.

History

Westgold Resources was incorporated in Western Australia on 27 July 1987 and listed on the Australian Securities Exchange under the code of WGX. The company underwent a number of name changes in its early years, originally being formed as Jenwood Resources NL, becoming Poverty Gold NL in April 1990, Gold and Resource Holdings NL in August 1993, Westgold Resources NL in January 1994 and Westgold Resources Limited in January 2008.

Metals X acquired a 27 percent interest in Westgold in 2006. In May 2011, Westgold merged with Aragon Resources Limited, which owned a number of non-operational gold mining assets in the Murchison Goldfields, among them the historic Big Bell Gold Mine. Historically, the gold tenements Aragon brought to the merger had produced 5 million ounces of gold.

In 2012, Metals X took complete control of Westgold, at a reported cost of A$67 million, and de-listed the company from the ASX but maintained it as a subsidiary. In October 2013, Westgold purchased the Australian gold assets of Alacer Gold Corporation, thereby acquiring the operational South Kalgoorlie Gold Mine and the Higginsville Gold Mine, thereby becoming a gold producing company.

The South Kalgoorlie remained with Westgold after the de-merger, but the company sold the mine in March 2018 for A$80 million to Northern Star Resources, of which A$20 minion was paid in cash and the remainder in shares. The Higginsville mine was sold in June 2019 to Canadian company RNC Minerals for A$50 million, half of which was paid in cash and the remainder in shares. RNC Minerals, at the time, already owned the nearby Beta Hunt Mine.

In June 2014, Westgold acquired the Meekatharra Gold Operation, centered around the Bluebird Gold Mine, from the administrators of GMK Exploration, recommencing mining at Meekatharra in June 2015.

In October 2015, Westgold acquired the Fortnum Gold Mine. 

Metals X and Westgold de-merged in December 2016 and the latter was subsequently re-listed on the ASX. While a number of Metals X board members initially remained on the board of both companies, Peter Cook became the managing director of Westgold, with the intention of resigning from the Metals X board in the following year.

Cook, a director of the company since 2004, retired from his position as chairman in March 2022, being replaced by Cheryl Edwardes.

Production
Annual production of the company since becoming a gold producer in late 2013:

References

External links 
 
 MINEDEX website: Westgold Resources Limited Database of the Department of Mines, Industry Regulation and Safety

Gold mining companies of Australia
Companies listed on the Australian Securities Exchange
Gold mining in Western Australia
Companies based in Western Australia
1987 establishments in Australia